James Kennedy is a Democratic former member of the New Hampshire House of Representatives, representing the Rockingham 13th District starting in 2006.

External links
New Hampshire House of Representatives - James Kennedy official NH House website
Project Vote Smart - Representative James E. Kennedy (NH) profile
Follow the Money - James E Kennedy
2006 campaign contributions

Politicians from Chelsea, Massachusetts
Members of the New Hampshire House of Representatives
1945 births
Living people